Jarmo Saastamoinen (born 20 September 1967) is a Finnish former football player.

Career honours
Winner:
 Mestaruussarja: (1) 1989
 Veikkausliiga: (2) 1991, 1997
 Finnish Cup: (2) 1998, 2000
Runner-up:
 Veikkausliiga: 1990, 1992, 1999

References
 Veikkausliigan verkkonäyttely
 Finnish Players Abroad

1967 births
Living people
Sportspeople from Vantaa
Finnish footballers
Finland international footballers
FC Lahti players
FC Kuusysi players
AIK Fotboll players
FF Jaro players
Helsingin Jalkapalloklubi players
FC Haka players
Veikkausliiga players
Allsvenskan players
Finnish expatriate footballers
Expatriate footballers in Sweden
Association football defenders